Skenea ferruginea is a species of sea snail, a marine gastropod mollusk in the family Skeneidae.

Description
The size of the shell attains 1.7 mm.

Distribution
This species occurs in the Northern Atlantic Ocean off Greenland and Iceland at depths between 156 m and 900 m.

References

 Warén, A. 1991. New and little known Mollusca from Iceland and Scandinavia. Sarsia 76: 53–124
 Gofas, S.; Le Renard, J.; Bouchet, P. (2001). Mollusca, in: Costello, M.J. et al. (Ed.) (2001). European register of marine species: a check-list of the marine species in Europe and a bibliography of guides to their identification. Collection Patrimoines Naturels, 50: pp. 180–213

ferruginea
Gastropods described in 1991